The list of ship launches in 1783 includes a chronological list of some ships launched in 1783.


References

1783
Ship launches